Polynema howardii is a species of fairyflies or fairy wasps, insects in the family Mymaridae. It has a Nearctic distribution.

References

External links 

 Polynema howardii at insectoid.info

Mymaridae
Insects described in 1887